格格 Blue is second album and first major album by Gary Chaw (Chinese: 曹格), released on 27 January 2006.

Track listing
All songs composed by Gary Chaw, except for "Superwoman", which was Karyn White cover of Mandarin version; "姑娘", which contains sample of traditional song "Jasmine (茉莉花)" (unknown author/composer but the original author/composer is 何方 if rumors, gave a share with whom credits).
"世界唯一的妳" (The world's only you) is originally Gary Chaw wrote a song for the homeless cat with no owner (now it belongs to him), later another lyricist(s) to re-wrote the different lyrics.
Lyricists are listed below.
Superwoman  Lyricist: 徐世珍; Composers: Kenneth "Babyface" Edmonds / Antonio "L.A." Reid / Daryl Simmons
世界唯一的妳  Lyricists: 徐世珍 / 永邦 (Yong Bang also co-wrote lyrics, credited on the some of internet and uncredited on the album)
姑娘  Lyricist and Composer: Gary Chaw / 何方
情人節快樂  Lyricist: 小色
Fall In Love  Lyricist: 阿佛列德 (Hank)
笑我笨  Lyricist: Gary Chaw
燭光晚餐  Lyricist: 葛大為
數到五答應我  Lyricist: Gary Chaw
沉默玩具  Lyricist: 伊藤
刮目相看  Lyricist: 廖世傑
Superwoman Kala (伴奏/Karaoke Version)

Translation 

Superwoman
The Only One In The World
Girl 
Happy Valentines
Fall In Love
Laugh At My Stupidity
Candle Light Dinner
Promise Me After Count To Five
Silent Toy
Look With Approval
Superwoman - Instrumental

References

External links 
Blue (Gary Chaw album) - KKBOX
Blue (Gary Chaw album) - Discogs

2006 albums
Gary Chaw albums